Stacia Dubin (born August 8, 1972) is a former American television news anchor and reporter.

Biography 
Stacia Dubin was born August 8, 1972, in Milwaukee. She graduated from Nicolet High School in Glendale, Wisconsin in 1990.  She earned a bachelor's degree in journalism from the University of Wisconsin–Madison.

Dubin began her career as a reporter at a television station in Rhinelander, Wisconsin.  After seven weeks in that job, she took a reporting job at WKBT-TV in La Crosse, Wisconsin. She then shifted to WITI-TV in Milwaukee in 1996.

Dubin left WITI in 2000 in a contract dispute.  In the fall of 2000, Dubin joined WBBM-TV in Chicago as a free-lance reporter.  In the summer of 2001, she was brought onto full-time status, specifically reporting for the station's morning newscasts. In 2002, WBBM-TV promoted Dubin to being a weekday morning news anchor. In 2003, Dubin told the Wisconsin Jewish Chronicle newspaper that "If a New York station came knocking on my door, would I go?  Probably.  But right now Chicago affords me a big city opportunity in a big market." In August 2004, Dubin left WBBM-TV.  She has not worked in television since.

Dubin married Chicago orthopedic surgeon Mark Cohen in Milwaukee on January 1, 2005.

References 

1972 births
Living people
University of Wisconsin–Madison School of Journalism & Mass Communication alumni
Television anchors from Chicago
American television reporters and correspondents
American women television journalists
21st-century American women